Answer for Heaven is a 2019 Thai language television series starring Sunny Suwanmethanont, Kan Kantathavor and Pattarasaya Kruasawan.

The plot revolves around an angel Tep (Sunny Suwanmethanont) who falls to earth to investigate why humans are doing fewer good deeds. At the same time, halos are appearing around the sun at an unprecedented frequency, believed to be attributed to aliens.

It was broadcast from 18 April to 14 June 2019 on One 31 and released on Netflix on 28 June 2019.

Cast
 Sunny Suwanmethanont as Tep
 Kan Kantathavorn as Ad
 Pattarasaya Kruasawan as Da
 Chayanan Manomaisantiphap as Inspector Pang

Release
Answer for Heaven was released on June 27, 2019 on Netflix streaming.

References

External links
 
 

2010s Thai television series
2018 Thai television series debuts
One 31 original programming